Jason Thomas Bahr (born February 15, 1995) is an American professional baseball pitcher who is a free agent.

Career
Bahr attended Lake Mary High School in Lake Mary, Florida. He enrolled at the University of Central Florida (UCF) and made the UCF Knights baseball team as a walk on. He was cut from the team by coach Terry Rooney after the 2015 season, but new coach Greg Lovelady brought Bahr back on the team in 2017.

The San Francisco Giants selected Bahr in the fifth round, with the 156th overall selection, of the 2017 MLB draft. He signed and made his professional debut with the Salem-Keizer Volcanoes where he was 3–2 with a 3.55 ERA in 13 games (seven starts). He began 2018 with the Augusta GreenJackets and was promoted to the San Jose Giants in June.

On July 8, 2018, the Giants traded Bahr, Austin Jackson, and Cory Gearrin to the Rangers for a PTBNL or cash considerations. He finished the year with the Down East Wood Ducks of the Class A-Advanced Carolina League. In 24 starts between Augusta, San Jose and the Ducks, he went 10–8 with a 3.52 ERA. Bahr was assigned back to Down East to open the 2019 season, and went 6–1 with a 1.71 ERA in 58 innings for them. On June 21, he was promoted to the Frisco RoughRiders of the Double-A Texas League, and went 4–3 with a 3.23 ERA in 64 innings for them. Bahr was named the Texas Rangers 2019 Nolan Ryan Minor League Pitcher of the Year. Bahr did not play in 2020 due to the cancellation of the Minor League Baseball season because of the COVID-19 pandemic. Bahr spent the 2021 season with the Round Rock Express of the Triple-A West, struggling to a 2–1 record with a 9.00 ERA over 33 innings. Bahr returned to Round Rock to open the 2022 season. He was released on July 25.

References

External links

UCF Knights bio

Minor league baseball players
1995 births
Living people